In the geologic timescale, the Asselian is the earliest geochronologic age or lowermost chronostratigraphic stage of the Permian. It is a subdivision of the Cisuralian Epoch or Series. It was preceded by the Gzhelian (the latest or uppermost subdivision in the Carboniferous) and followed by the Sakmarian.

Stratigraphy 
The Asselian Stage was introduced into scientific literature in 1954, when the Russian stratigrapher V.E. Ruzhenchev split it from the Artinskian. At that moment the Artinskian still encompassed most of the lower Permian – its current definitions are more restricted. The Asselian is named after the Assel River in the southern Ural Mountains of Kazakhstan and Bashkortostan.

The base of the Asselian Stage is at the same time the base of the Cisuralian Series and the Permian System. It is defined as the place in the stratigraphic record where fossils of the conodont Streptognathodus isolatus first appear. The global reference profile for the base (the GSSP or golden spike) is located in the valley of the Aidaralash River, near Aqtöbe in the Ural Mountains of Kazakhstan. The top of the Asselian stage (the base of the Sakmarian stage) is at the first appearance of conodont species Streptognathodus postfusus.

The Asselian contains five conodont biozones:
zone of Streptognathodus barskovi
zone of Streptognathodus postfusus
zone of Streptognathodus fusus
zone of Streptognathodus constrictus
zone of Streptognathodus isolatus

References

External links
GeoWhen Database - Asselian
Upper Paleozoic stratigraphic chart at the website of the subcommission for stratigraphic information of the ICS

 
Permian geochronology
.